The Railroad Commission of Texas (RRC; also sometimes called the Texas Railroad Commission, TRC) is the state agency that regulates the oil and gas industry, gas utilities, pipeline safety, safety in the liquefied petroleum gas industry, and surface coal and uranium mining. Despite its name, it ceased regulating railroads in 2005, when the last of the rail functions were transferred to the Texas Department of Transportation.

Established by the Texas Legislature in 1891, it is the state's oldest regulatory agency and began as part of the Efficiency Movement of the Progressive Era. From the 1930s to the 1960s it largely set world oil prices, but was displaced by OPEC (Organization of Petroleum Exporting Countries) after 1973.  In 1984, the federal government took over transportation regulation for railroads, trucking and buses, but the Railroad Commission kept its name. With an annual budget of $79 million, it now focuses entirely on oil, gas, mining, propane, and pipelines, setting allocations for production each month.

The three-member commission was initially appointed by the governor, but an amendment to the state's constitution in 1894 established the commissioners as elected officials who serve overlapping six-year terms, like the sequence in the U.S. Senate, elected statewide. No specific seat is designated as chairman; the commissioners choose the chairman from among themselves. Normally the commissioner who faces reelection is the chairman for the preceding two years. The current commissioners are Jim Wright since January 4, 2021, Wayne Christian since January 9, 2017, and Christi Craddick since December 17, 2012.

Origins
Attempts to establish a railroad commission in Texas began in 1876. After five legislative failures, an amendment to the state constitution providing for a railroad commission was submitted to voters in 1890. The amendment's ratification and the 1890 election of Governor James S. Hogg, a liberal Democrat, permitted the legislature in 1894 to create the Railroad Commission, giving it jurisdiction over operations of railroads, terminals, wharves, and express companies. It could set rates, issue rules on how to classify freight, require adequate railroad reports, and prohibit and punish discrimination and extortion by corporations. George Clark, running as an independent "Jeffersonian Democratic"  candidate for governor in 1892, denounced the TRC as, "Wrong in principle, undemocratic, and unrepublican Commissions do no good. They do harm. Their only function is to harass. I regard it as essentially foolish and essentially vicious."  Clark lost the 1892 election to Hogg but a federal judge ruled the TRC illegal; the judge in turn was overruled by the United States Supreme Court. The governor appointed the first members; the first elections to the commission were held in 1893, with three commissioners serving six-year, overlapping terms. The TRC did not have jurisdiction over interstate rates, but Texas was so large that the in-state traffic it regulated was of dominant importance.

John H. Reagan (1818–1903), the first head of the TRC (1891–1903), had been the most outspoken advocate in Congress of bills to regulate railroads in the 1880s. He feared the corruption caused by railroad monopolies and considered their control a moral challenge. As chairman of the TRC, he changed his views when he became acquainted with the realities of the complex forces affecting railroad management.  Reagan turned to the Efficiency Movement for ideas, establishing a pattern of regulatory practice that TRC used for decades. He believed that the agency should pursue two main goals: to protect consumers from unfair railway practices and excessive rates, and to support the state's overall economic growth. To find the optimal rates that met these goals he focused the TRC on the collection of data, direct negotiation with railway executives, and compromises with the parties involved. The agency did not have the legal authority to set rates, nor did it have the resources to spend much of its time in court battles. The carrot was far more important than the stick.  Freight rates continued to decline dramatically. In 1891, a typical rate was 1.403 cents per ton mile. By 1907 the rate was 1.039 cents – a decline of 25%. However the railroads did not have rates high enough for them to upgrade their equipment and lower costs in the face of competition from pipelines, cars and trucks, and the Texas railway system began a slow decline.

Segregation
From the 1890s through the 1960s, the Texas Railroad Commission found it difficult to fully enforce Jim Crow segregation legislation. Because of the expense involved, Texas railroads often allowed wealthier blacks to mix with whites, rather than provide separate cars, dining facilities, and even depots. In addition, West Texas authorities often refused to enforce Jim Crow laws because few African Americans resided there. In the 1940s, the railroad commission's enforcement of segregation laws began collapsing further, in part because of the great number of African American soldiers that were transported during World War II.  The trains were integrated in the early 1960s.

Expansion to oil
The agency's reach expanded as it took over responsibility for regulating oil pipelines (in 1917), oil and gas production (1919), natural gas delivery systems (1920), bus lines (1927), and trucking (1929). It grew from  12 employees in 1916 to 69 in 1930 and 566 in 1939.  It does not have jurisdiction over investor owned electric utility companies; that falls under the jurisdiction of the Public Utility Commission of Texas.

A crisis for the petroleum industry was created by the East Texas oil boom of the 1930s, as prices plunged to 25 cents a barrel. The traditional TRC policy of negotiating compromises failed; the governor was forced to call in the state militia to enforce order. Texas oilmen decided they preferred state to federal regulation, and wanted the TRC to give out quotas so that every producer would get higher prices and profits. Pure Oil Company opposed the first statewide oil prorationing order, which was issued by the TRC in August 1930. The order, which was intended to conserve oil resources by limiting the number of barrels drilled per day, was seen by small producers like Pure as a conspiracy between government and major companies to drive them out of business and foster monopoly in the oil industry.

Ernest O. Thompson (1892–1966), head of the TRC from 1932 to 1965, took charge of the agency and indeed the oil industry by appealing to an ideal of Texas's role in the global oil order—the civil religion of Texas oil. He cajoled, harangued, and browbeat recalcitrant producers into compliance with the TRC's prorationing orders. The New Deal allowed the TRC to set national oil policy.  As late as the 1950s the TRC controlled over 40% of United States crude production and approximately half of estimated national proved reserves.  It served as a model in the creation of OPEC. Gordon M. Griffin, chief engineer of the TRC during World War II, developed the formula for prorationing to keep production flowing for the military.

Because it needed access to the Texas headquarters of the various oil companies, it became a long term tenant at the Milam Building.

Operations
Regulation was a practical rather than ideological affair. The TRC typically worked with the regulated industries to improve operations, share best practices, and address consumer complaints. Radical activities like rate setting to favor shippers or producers or consumers, and heated court battles, were the exception rather than the rule.

Within the oil and gas industry, it took into account production in other states, in effect bringing total available supply, (including imports, which were small) within the principle of prorationing to market demand.  Allowable oilfield production was calculated as follows:  estimated market demand, minus uncontrolled additions to supply, gave the Texas total; this was then prorated among fields and wells in a manner calculated to preserve equity among producers, and to prevent any well from producing beyond its maximum efficient rate (MER). Scheduled allowables are expressed in numbers of calendar days of permitted production per month at MER. In the spring of 2013, new hydraulic fracturing water recycling rules were adopted in the state of Texas by the Railroad Commission of Texas. The Water Recycling Rules are intended to encourage Texas hydraulic fracturing operators to conserve water used in the hydraulic fracturing process for oil and gas wells.

Recent history
As of March, 2022, the commission members are Wayne Christian (chairman), Christi Craddick, and Jim Wright. All three members are Republicans. Christian was elected in 2016 as a commissioner and a chairman in 2019. Craddick was elected in 2012 and reelected in 2018. Wright was elected in 2020.

Effective October 1, 2005, as a result of House Bill 2702 the rail oversight functions of the Railroad Commission were transferred to the Texas Department of Transportation. The traditional name of the commission was not changed despite the loss of its titular regulatory duties.

Court cases involving the commission
The Shreveport Rate Case, also known as Houston E. & W. Ry. Co. v. United States, 234 U.S. 342 (1914) arose from the Railroad Commission's setting railroad freight rates unequally. Because of the low intrastate rates, shippers in eastern Texas tended to ship their wares to Dallas (in Texas), rather than to Shreveport, Louisiana, although Shreveport was considerably closer to much of eastern Texas.  The Railroad Commission's (and the railroad's) position was that only the state could regulate commerce within a state, and that the federal government had no power so to do.  The Supreme Court ruled that the federal government's ability to regulate interstate commerce necessarily included the ability to regulate intrastate "operations in all matters having a close and substantial relation to interstate traffic" and to ensure that "interstate commerce may be conducted upon fair terms".

The Railroad Commission has also figured prominently in two major U.S. Supreme Court cases on the doctrine of abstention:
 Railroad Commission v. Pullman Co., a 1941 case in which the U.S. Supreme Court ruled that it was appropriate for federal courts to abstain from hearing a case to allow state courts to decide substantial constitutional issues that touch upon sensitive areas of state social policy, specifically the race of railroad employees.
 Burford v. Sun Oil Co., a 1943 case in which the U.S. Supreme Court ruled that a federal court sitting in diversity jurisdiction may abstain from hearing the case where the state courts likely have greater expertise in a particularly complex and unclear area of state law which is of special significance to the state, where there is comprehensive state administrative/regulatory procedure, and where the federal issues cannot be decided without delving into state law.

Commissioners
The commissioners are elected in statewide partisan elections for six-year terms, with one commission seat up for election every two years. The commission selects a chairperson from among their members every year

Offices and districts
The agency is headquartered in the William B. Travis State Office Building at 1701 North Congress Avenue in Austin. In addition, the Texas Railroad Commission has twelve oil and gas district offices located throughout the state. The district offices facilitate communication between industry representatives and the Commission.

See also

 Oil and gas law in the United States
 History of Texas

Bibliography
 Childs, William R.  The Texas Railroad Commission: Understanding Regulation in America to the Mid-Twentieth Century. (2005). 323 pp. the standard history; online review
 Childs, William R. "Origins of the Texas Railroad Commission's Power to Control Production of Petroleum: Regulatory Strategies in the 1920s." Journal of Policy History 1990 2(4): 353–387. 
  De Chazeau, Melvin G., and Alfred E. Kahn. Integration and Competition in the Petroleum Industry (1959) online edition
 Green, George N. "Thompson, Ernest Othmer," The Handbook of Texas Online (2008)
 Norvell, James R. "The Railroad Commission of Texas: its Origin and History." Southwestern Historical Quarterly 1965 68(4): 465–480.  online edition
 Prindle, David F.  Petroleum Politics and the Texas Railroad Commission.  (1981). 230 pp., focuses on relations with independent oilmen
 David F. Prindle, "Railroad Commission," Handbook of Texas Online (2008)
 Procter, Ben H. Not Without Honor: The Life of John H. Reagan (1962).
 Procter, Ben H. Reagan,  John Henninger," Handbook of Texas Online (2008)
 Splawn, W. M. W. "Valuation and Rate Regulation by the Railroad Commission of Texas," Journal of Political Economy'' Vol. 31, No. 5 (Oct., 1923), pp. 675–707 in JSTOR

References

External links
 
 
 "Hazardous Business: Industry, Regulation, and the Texas Railroad Commission" from Texas State Library and Archives Commission
 Conversion of EBCDIC files

 
State agencies of Texas
Petroleum in Texas
History of the petroleum industry in the United States
Oil and gas law
Government agencies established in 1891
1891 establishments in Texas
Petroleum politics
United States railroad regulation
Rail transportation in Texas